Mona Khaled (born 9 April 1994) is an Egyptian chess player.

She is the first Egyptian and Arabic Player to achieve the Woman Grandmaster Title. Mona is the first and only girl to ever win the Egyptian Chess Championship in 2013. She has at times won the Women's African Chess Championship, the Women's Arab Chess Championship, the Mediterranean Women's Title and the Francophone Women's Title.

She represented Egypt in the Women's Chess Olympiad from 2008 to  2018; leading the Women's Egyptian Team on board 1 in Tromso Olympiad, the winner of Gold Medal of Category C.

She has competed in the Women's World Chess Championship from 2012 to 2017.

References

External links 
 

1994 births
Living people
Egyptian female chess players
Chess woman grandmasters
African Games gold medalists for Egypt
African Games medalists in chess
Competitors at the 2011 All-Africa Games
21st-century Egyptian women